Artem Sergeyevich Grigoriev (born 27 February 1992) is a Russian former competitive figure skater. He is the 2009 World Junior bronze medalist and won three medals on the ISU Junior Grand Prix series.

Programs

Competitive highlights
JGP: Junior Grand Prix

References

External links

 
 Artem Grigoriev at Tracings.net

Living people
Russian male single skaters
1992 births
Figure skaters from Moscow
World Junior Figure Skating Championships medalists